Paris enquêtes criminelles is a French television series broadcast since May 3, 2007, on TF1.

Synopsis

Adapted from Law & Order: Criminal Intent, it follows the investigations of two police detectives with very different methods of investigation. Vincent Revel (Vincent Pérez) is very intuitive, while his partner,  Claire Savigny (Sandrine Rigaux), is more logical. The first season's episodes were adapted from episodes of the first season of Criminal Intent. This French adaptation of the Law & Order franchise is the only one not to use the voice-over introduction and the title cards between scene changes. Both the other international versions (Russian and British) use these icons.

The show was renewed for a third season, which began broadcasting on November 6, 2008. Claire Savigny was replaced by Mélanie Rousseau, played by Audrey Looten.

Cast
Vincent Pérez as Commander Vincent Revel (Season 1 – Season 3)
Sandrine Rigaux as Lieutenant Claire Savigny (Season 1)
Jacques Pater as Police Chief Bonnefoy (Season 1)
Hélène Godec as Judge Frances Lherbier (Season 1)
Laure Killing as Judge Fontana (Season 1 – Season 3)
Audrey Looten as Mélanie Rousseau (Season 2 – Season 3)

Guest
 Anne Charrier as Catherine
 Aurélien Recoing as Father Roche
 Émilie Gavois-Kahn as Judith
 Patrick d'Assumçao as The locksmith

Episodes

Season 1

Season 2

Season 3

DVD releases

References

External links
 Official website
 Fansite
 

2000s TV shows in France
2007 French television series debuts
2008 French television series endings
French police procedural television series
Law & Order: Criminal Intent
French television series based on American television series
Television shows set in France
Television shows set in Paris